The Otis Air Force Base BOMARC site was a Cold War USAF launch complex for Boeing CIM-10 Bomarc surface-to-air missiles.

The site was run by the 26th Air Defense Missile Squadron, initially part of the Boston Air Defense Sector, 26th Air Division.

References

External links
BOMARC Otis AFB
BOMARC Site Configuration
Cape played role in nuclear defense

Installations of the United States Air Force  in Massachusetts
Aerospace Defense Command military installations
Military installations closed in 1972
Sandwich, Massachusetts
Surface-to-air missile batteries of the United States